Arlington is a community in the Canadian province of Nova Scotia, located in Kings County.

References
  Arlington on Destination Nova Scotia

Communities in Kings County, Nova Scotia